Dragučova ( or ) is a settlement in the Municipality of Pesnica in northeastern Slovenia. It lies in the hills northeast of Maribor on the edge of the Pesnica Valley. The area is part of the traditional region of Styria. It is now included in the Drava Statistical Region.

References

External links
Dragučova on Geopedia

Populated places in the Municipality of Pesnica